Shahinlal Meloly (born 15 May 1990) is an Indian professional footballer who plays as a goalkeeper for Chennai City F.C. in the I-League.

Career
Born in Calicut, Kerala, Meloly started his footballing career with Viva Kerala as a youth player in 2008. He then signed for Pune F.C. of the I-League in 2011. Then, in October 2011, Meloly gained fame when he was praised by former Blackburn Rovers manager Steve Kean after Pune took on the Premier League side in a friendly at the Balewadi Sports Complex. Kean said of Meloly that "He was brave. I think he pulled off a triple block at one stage. He is one the club should keep an eye on."

On 19 December 2014, he signed for I-League newcomers Bharat FC.

International
Meloly was part of the India U19 side in 2007.

Career statistics

Honours

Club

Chennaiyin FC
 Indian Super League: 2017-18 Champions

References

External links
 Pune Football Club Profile.

1990 births
Living people
Indian footballers
Chirag United Club Kerala players
Pune FC players
Association football goalkeepers
Footballers from Kerala
I-League players
India youth international footballers
Sportspeople from Kozhikode
Indian Super League players
Chennaiyin FC players
Chennai City FC players